Zaer Ebrahimi (also Romanized as Zā'er Ebrāhīmī; also known as Ebrāhīm) is a village in Delvar Rural District, Delvar District, Tangestan County, Bushehr Province, Iran. 56 families made up its 214 residents in 2006, according to the census.

References 

Populated places in Tangestan County